Local Hero is a 2016 South Korean espionage television drama series, starring Park Shi Hoo, Jo Sung-ha, Lee Soo-hyuk, Kwon Yuri and Yoon Tae-young. It was first broadcast on January 23, 2016 on OCN.

Plot
Former secret agent Baek Shi Yoon (Park Shi-hoo) is a well-trained human weapon. Hiding his past, he buys the bar "Neighborhood" and runs it as the owner. He gets close to the Neighborhood regulars at his bar and he sympathizes with their pain. He then meets a young man, Choi Chan Gyu (Lee Soo-hyuk)  who works as a temporary employee. Choi Chan Gyu wants to become a police officer. Baek Shi Yoon trains him as a secret agent and they fight together against evil.

Cast

Main cast
Park Si-hoo as Baek Shi-yoon – A former intelligence agent, Shi-yoon was imprisoned for 3 years after a mission in Macau failed, resulting in the death of his partner, Jin Woo. After being released from prison, he bought a bar where former agents could gather. During the series, he uses the bar as a cover to investigate various crimes and the real reason for his partner's death in Macau.  As crimes happened around him, Shi-yoon can't help himself but provide aide to the victims, becoming the "Shadow".
Jo Sung-ha as Im Tae-Ho – A married police officer with 3 kids, Tae-Ho manages a subcontracting company in secrecy to support his family. He hires Chan-gyu as one of his employees to keep tabs on officials and persons.
Lee Soo-hyuk as Choi Chan-gyu – An aspiring police officer, Chan-gyu takes any job in order to take care of his father and brother. After seeing how Chan-gyu has athletic abilities (when he outran the guards at the police entrance exam), he is hired by Tae-Ho to secretly monitor a few targets, who later end up dead. Because of this, he becomes a prime suspect for the disappearances, but is later vindicated. He discovers Shi-yoon's alterego as the "Shadow" and asks him to train him. He has a crush on Writer Bae. In the end he becomes a police constable.
Kwon Yu-ri as Bae Jung-yeon – Before Shi-yoon bought the bar, Bae (often called as Writer Bae because of her job) already worked part-time under President Hwang. At first she thought Chan-gyu to be the Shadow because of his hat and mask, but later on realized that Shi-yoon was the real Shadow. She writes a fictional story based on spies and uses Shi-yoon and President Hwang as inspiration.
Yoon Tae-young as Yoon Sang-min
Jung Man-sik as Jung Soo-hyuk
Song Jae-ho as President Hwang
Choi Yoon-so as Kim Seo-an
Ji Il-joo as Jang Jin-woo
Kang Kyung-hun as Kang Ri-soo
Jin Kyung as Sun-young
Lee Soon-won as Han Joon-hee
Kim Bo-mi as So-mi
Lee Cheol-min as Jo Bong-chul
Ahn Suk-hwan as Park Sun-hoo

Additional cast
 Choi Deok-moon - Director Min
Lee Han-wi – Team Leader Song
 Park Sun-cheon – Joo-hee
 Kang Nam-kil – Seo Joon-suk
 Kim Wook - Je-Cheol
 Yoo In-hyuk - gang member
 Yeom Hye-ran - Park Sun-hoo wife's
 Cha Soon-bae - General Manager Hong
 Gratiano Wong - Dirty Businessman

Production
The show was first announced in August 2015, with reports of Park Shi-hoo making his return to the small screen through the spy thriller. Kwon Yuri and Lee Soo-hyuk were also in talks to play lead roles, and were later confirmed in early September. The cast had their first script reading on October 1, 2015 and the press conference was held on January 19, 2016 at the Times Square Amoris Hall in Yeongdeungpo, Seoul

Filming began in October in South Korea with some scenes filmed in Macau.

References

External links
 
 

OCN television dramas
2016 South Korean television series debuts
2016 South Korean television series endings
Korean-language television shows
South Korean action television series
South Korean crime television series